Cheval Rouge is an abstract sculpture by Alexander Calder.

Constructed in 1974 of painted sheet steel, it is at the National Gallery of Art Sculpture Garden.

See also
 List of public art in Washington, D.C., Ward 2

References

External links
"National Gallery of Art Sculpture Garden: Page Two", Bluffton

1974 sculptures
Collections of the National Gallery of Art
Outdoor sculptures in Washington, D.C.
Horses in art
Steel sculptures in Washington, D.C.
National Gallery of Art Sculpture Garden
Sculptures by Alexander Calder